Zorica (July 1308) or Carica, was a Serbian princess, the daughter of King Stefan Milutin (r. 1282–1321) and Queen Elizabeth of Hungary. Her father planned to marry her to Charles, the son of Charles, Count of Valois, having signed an agreement in Serbia in July 1308, however, after Milutin's unsuccessful southward military operations and sabotage of the mission of the Papal legates sent into Serbia, Charles of Valois pulled out. She is depicted in frescos at Gračanica and Visoki Dečani.

References

14th-century Serbian royalty
14th-century Serbian women
Medieval Serbian princesses
Date of birth unknown
Date of death unknown
Year of birth unknown
Nemanjić dynasty
14th-century deaths
14th-century Eastern Orthodox Christians